Brian Feeney may refer to:

 Brian Feeney (engineer), leader of the da Vinci Project
 Brian Feeney (hurler) (born 1970), Irish retired hurler